Glenn Robertson Yarbrough (January 12, 1930 – August 11, 2016) was an American folk singer and guitarist. He was the lead singer (tenor) with the Limeliters from 1959 to 1963 and also had a prolific solo career.  Yarbrough had a restlessness and dissatisfaction with the music industry which led him to question his priorities, later focusing on sailing and the setting up of a school for orphans.

Early life
Glenn Yarbrough was born in Milwaukee on 12 January 1930, later moving to New York where his parents were practicing social workers. However, because there were few jobs available during the Great Depression, his father traveled around the country from one job to another, and Yarbrough lived with his mother in New York City helping to support her as a paid boy soprano in the Choir of Men and Boys at Grace Church in Manhattan.

He was offered a scholarship at  St. Paul's School, located at Brooklandville, Maryland, graduating in 1948.  After a year travelling around the US, Canada and Mexico, he enrolled in college at St. John's College in Annapolis, Maryland, where his roommate was Jac Holzman, later the founder of Elektra Records. Yarbrough said that initially Holzman had wanted to call the label Elektra-Stratford Records, but "I suggested Elektra Records because it was a little shorter, and that's what we went with: Elektra Records."

When Woody Guthrie performed an impromptu performance for the roommates, Yarbrough became interested in folk music and learned the guitar. Holzman would later record Here We Go Baby, (also known as Songs by Glenn Yarbrough) an early solo album by Yarbrough in 1957. Greg Adams noted that the album was "ahead of the game in terms of combining pop and folk music" and while not a success commercially [was] "an entertaining and fascinating artifact from the pre-dawn of the folk boom." The album was also described in the liner notes as a departure from the more traditional folk music on the Elektra label, and  a "showcase to highlight and display [Yarbrough's] virtuosity...undertaken for the sake of an unusual talent." Yarbrough was approached by Fred Hellerman and asked if Pete Seeger could play the banjo on some tracks and this put Yarbrough in touch with the politics of the McCarthyism era of blacklists of musicians. Yarbrough felt at the time that having Seeger on the record was a risk and expressed disappointment with his attitude and quality of work, asking Erik Darling to replace him.

Yarbrough served in the U.S. Army during the Korean War, initially deciphering codes and later with the entertainment corps.
After military service, he moved to South Dakota, to help his father run a square dance barn, and started appearing on local television shows. In the mid-1950s, Al Grossman, who ran the Gate of Horn, a small folk club in Chicago, booked Yarbrough for a two-week engagement. Here, he developed some of the most important relationships of his career with artists like Odetta and Shel Silverstein.

The Limeliters
By the late 1950s, Yarbrough had moved to Aspen, Colorado and purchased a small nightclub called The Limelite. When Yarbrough was performing with Alex Hassilev at the Cosmo Alley coffeeshop in Hollywood in 1959 they impressed Lou Gottlieb, a jazz pianist who was working on arrangements for the Kingston Trio.  Gottlieb suggested that the three of them work together and when they discovered that their voices blended well they began playing on the folk circuit. "They had the uncanny knack of making three voices sound like six," wrote John Puccio in Sensible Sound, "and thanks to their velvet harmonies making a trio sound like a choir." They named themselves the Limeliters after the club owned by Yarbrough. A journalist described Yarbrough as possessing "one of the purest, most exquisite voices on the planet."

In 1960, The Limeliters recorded their first album on the Elektra label, and in 1961, their second album, Tonight: In Person, "reached No. 5 on the Billboard charts, where it stayed for 74 weeks."  Between 1961 and 1963, the Limeliters "made appearances on television, sang on commercials and embarked on an exhausting touring schedule that saw them perform as many as 310 days out of each year." It was claimed that in 1963, the Limeliters "broke the Hungry I's all-time attendance record and the lines to get into the club, snaked all the way around the block."

As a lyric tenor and guitarist, Yarbrough contributed to the success of the Limeliters as they  performed "an extensive repertoire of traditional and contemporary songs...[touring]...extensively throughout the U.S...[and]...releasing nearly a dozen albums for RCA Victor." The Limeliters were known for their "burnished tight harmonies, sophisticated if nontraditional arrangements and witty onstage banter...[with]...Yarbrough's silvery tenor...the group's acoustic linchpin."

On 12 December 1962, a plane the Limeliters had chartered crashed in Utah. While everybody survived, Yarbrough had a head injury, was shaken by the experience and began to "reassess his priorities". He did leave the Limeliters in that year, noting in an interview that he had lost interest in folk music and "got tired of the three chord songs...[and]... by that time people were beginning to write things like Rod McKuen's work."

Solo career
As well as the folk-oriented 1957 solo record Here We Go, Baby, Yarbrough made other albums before joining the Limeliters.  The sleeve notes of the 1957 record Come and Sit by My Side noted that Yarbrough [brought] "folk music up to date, sings in a manner that modern listeners will understand and appreciate...[a]...novel, youthful approach to the old songs." In 1958 he made an album with Marilyn Child. Robert Sherman said "both of these vital, young performers have dramatic, highly personal styles, yet their voices and delivery are perfectly suited to each other,"

After leaving the Limeliters, Yarbrough had intended  to sail around the world, but while making plans for this, appeared as a guitar player in a November 1964 episode of Wagon Train. He did buy a boat, but was persuaded by RCA to  postpone his trip and record solo albums. His first solo after leaving the Limeliters, Time to Move On (1964) was seen by one reviewer as [setting] "the tone for the rest of his career: light acoustic arrangements, songs from an eclectic array of sources, and vibrato-laden vocals...falling somewhere between pop and folk." Jason Verlinde, a music journalist and co-founder of the Fretboard Journal compared Yarbrough's smooth tenor voice on this record to "the mighty seas that gave this legendary folksinger a case of wanderlust - occasionally rough but always beautiful and strong." Baby the Rain Must Fall, the title song of the 1965 film of the same name made it to No. 12 on the singles chart, making it his biggest hit. An LP, also called "Baby the Rain Must Fall", hit No. 35 on the albums chart.

In 1966, Yarbrough reflecting on his time with the Limeliters, said that it had all been "intellectual...[with]...Lou Gottlieb and Alex Hasseliv to sign autographs and be scintillating at after-show parties", but as a solo performer he needed to come to terms with more direct attention from his fans, even being regarded as a "sex symbol".

Yarbrough had a working relationship with Rod McKuen and by 1968 had recorded around 45 of his songs. He later recalled in an interview that he had no memory of the first McKuen song he recorded, but said that he was thanked by the balladeer and they became close friends.

Solo performances were generally well received. Writing in the Fort Worth Star-Telegram in 1967 after a performance at the Texas Woman's University campus in Denton, Texas, Lani Presswood described Yarbrough's voice "as one of those rare, unmistakable things...[with]...a lyrical quality which makes you think of a spring breeze rippling a field of ankle-deep clover." Following a concert at Coe College, Iowa in 1969, a reviewer described the performance as professional, concluding that "Glenn Yarbrough puts on a worthwhile show.  The audience paid three dollars apiece and got about five dollars worth of entertainment." In September 1970, Yarbrough performed at the Saskatchewan Center of the Arts.  He was said to be in full control, with an electric warmth, a "vibrancy that sweeps over the audience and envelopes it", even succeeding in doing material that involved audience participation, seen by the reviewer as "one of the riskiest tricks in show business."

By 1972, Yarbrough was voicing dissatisfaction with the entertainment industry, later commenting that he never sang to meet people's expectations, had "mixed feelings about stardom" and saw money as "pain in the ass just to take care of." In an interview in 1983, Yarbrough acknowledged that while he didn't care much for the music business, the decision had to be made sometimes to perform to earn money, concluding: I used to think singing was something you do for money.  As  I get older, I believe it's why I am here. It's my talent and it's what I should do. In an industrial society...music is what people need...[and despite misgivings about the industry,  maintained enthusasiam]... we do some of the old songs, but not too many, because I live to move.

Yarbrough provided vocals for the Rankin/Bass animated versions of "The Hobbit" (1977) and "The Return of the King" (1980), singing "Frodo of the Nine Fingers".

In 1980 Yarbrough introduced what one journalist described as "his new sound", with less upbeat ballads and more mellow tunes, due in part to a case of strep throat at the time. In the same article Yarbrough noted that he was getting a lot of resistance from major records companies for his new album Changing Force, which they said had no hits.  Yarbrough explained the album was composed of "rock ballads", and while noting that his music at the time was commercial, he stressed it was more than just "old stuff" and definitely not nostalgia, as he "liked to move ahead."

While it was not a reunion, Yarbrough did appear on the same bill as the Limeliters at the Sacramento Community Center in August 1982. He said on stage that it felt bizarre to be watching the Limeliters standing backstage, noting "it is an object lesson, if you think you cannot be replaced in this world."  Alex Hassilev said after the concert that the Limeliters had chosen some of their set to fit with the "mood of Yarbrough's", and included material that was gentle with less of a comic focus.

Yarbrough had said that he "hated Christmas music", but after reading The Forgotten Carols which gave him "chills up and down [his] spine"  and brought him to tears, he was inspired to tour performing Utah Composer Michael McLean's Forgotten Carols and creating a CD of the show. Yarbrough's attitude to Christmas was said to be related to  his childhood when his parents often could not afford to bring him home for the holidays and he spent a lot of time alone. He told Michael McLean that Christmas was never interesting to him, but the composer's reply to  Yarbrough was that his voice was God-given and he wanted it to be used to sing his music. Yarbrough credited McLean for helping him "rediscover Christmas...and Christmas for helping him rediscover his heart." The show involved Yarbrough doing both the narration and music, taking the role of a 2000-year-old man who tells the story "to help people open their hearts to the true significance of Christmas."

He protested against the Vietnam war, claiming that it "had attacked  the moral fiber of our country" and noted that after a performance of a protest song at the U.S. Air Force Academy, the audience applauded.

Interest in sailing
He had originally planned to do a movie on sailing, an area of special interest to Yarbrough not just because of a personal sense of awe of "waves 40 to 50 feet above you in a storm" but also as it provided the opportunity to get away from being "bombarded...[as consumers]...by the media and the big corporations." One journalist said that Yarbrough's love of sailing reflected the fact that while he  had been successful in the entertainment industry, "he saw through to the bottom of that illusory world, its temporary nature, its phoniness."

As an avid sailor, Yarbrough took many cruises on his 45-foot boat the Armorel and felt very attracted to staying in New Zealand, a country he described as having "the perfect form of government for a country its size...[and was]...almost like the United States must have been at the turn of the century." After divorcing his first wife Peggy Goodhart in 1964 and marrying Annie Graves, Yarbrough spend five years a 57-foot boat that he had built. As a result of requests from promoters at the time for the Limeliters to re-form, Yarbrough joined them for a reunion concert at Chicago's Orchestra Hall to a sold-out audience in 1973.  The group stayed together until 1981, after which Yarbrough spent most of the next twenty years on his boat, only returning to record and give concerts when necessary to finance his sailing. One review of a reunion concert at the Cocoanut Grove in 1976 said that with "Yarbrough on guitar along with his lugubrious vibratoed vocal instrument", the sound of the Limeliters was intact, concluding that their harmonies meant they remained "one of the best sounds around, untouched by age or fashion."

In January 1993, Yarbrough presented a programme of songs and a lecture at the Sailing Adventure Series at Orange Coast College. In a preview of the programme, the  Los Angeles Times described Yarbrough as an "accomplished seaman...[with]...his new boat, a 34-foot junk rig...designed for single-handed cruising."  In the same article, Yarbrough said sailing was both harder and "more frightening" than singing, but he still enjoyed the "give and take" with an audience, "communicating and touching people...but sailing is entirely different."

Children's school
Yarbrough began raising funds to establish a school for orphans in the late 1960s and said at that point, it was the only reason he continued to perform. The school which was said to have needed an annual budget of $250,000 to operate was described at Yarbrough as taking "a very radical approach to learning...to learn something about education and what helps the mind retain information."
After selling  many of his expensive possessions including cars, a house in New Zealand and a banana plantation in Jamaica Yarbrough eventually opened a school for disadvantaged youth in Los Angeles but it ran out of money and had to be closed down in the early 1970s. While unsuccessful, the school did reflect Yarbrough's desire to do something meaningful with his life to help families.

Personal life
In the hope of saving his faltering singing voice, Yarbrough had elective surgery on his larynx in 2010. The surgery was unsuccessful, and he went into cardiac arrest while in the recovery room and was put on a ventilator. He survived, but began to suffer from dementia and never sang in public again. From that time, Yarbrough had to be cared for full time by his daughter, Holly Yarbrough Burnett, in Nashville and died there in 2016 from chronic obstructive pulmonary disease (COPD). Though he suffered from dementia in the last years of his life, according to Burnett, her father remained a "warm, happy man."

Yarbrough married four times. The first three to Peggy Goodhart, Ann Graves and Laurie Ann Pool ended in divorce and at the time of his death,  he was separated from his fourth wife Kathleen Pommer. Yarbrough is survived by his daughter Holly, two children from his first marriage, Stephany Yarbrough and Sean Yarbrough; two stepdaughters, Brooke and Heather, from his marriage to Poole; a grandson; and a great-grandson.

Award nominations
As both a solo singer and member of the Limeliters Yarbrough was nominated several times for GRAMMY Awards.

8th Annual Grammy Awards (1966)
Nominated for: 
Best Vocal Performance Male:   Baby the Rain Must Fall (Album)
Best Contemporary (R&R) Single:  Baby the Rain Must Fall  (Single)
6th Annual Grammy Awards (1964)
Nominated for:
Best Gospel or Other Religious Recording (Musical): Makin' A Joyful Noise
5th Annual Grammy Awards (1963)
Nominated for:
Best Performance By A Vocal Group:  Through Children's Eyes
Best Recording for Children: Through Children's Eyes
4th Annual Grammy Awards (1962)
Nominated for:
Best Performance By a Vocal Group:  The Slightly Fabulous Limeliters (Album)
Best Folk Recording:  The Slightly Fabulous Limeliters

Discography

Albums

With The Limeliters
1960 The Limeliters
1960 Tonight: In Person
1961 The Slightly Fabulous Limeliters
1962 Sing Out!
1962 Through Children's Eyes
1962 Folk Matinee
1962 Our Men in San Francisco
1963 Makin' a Joyful Noise
1963 Fourteen 14K Folk Songs
1964 The Best of The Limeliters
1964 The London Concert
1968 Time to Gather Seeds
1974 The Limeliters Reunion Volume One
1974 The Limeliters Reunion Volume Two
1976 Glenn Yarbrough and The Limeliters Chicago tape I (released early 2000s (decade))
1976 Glenn Yarbrough and The Limeliters Chicago tape II (released in the early 2000s (decade))
1977 Pure Gold
1993 Joy Across the Land  Glenn Yarbrough and The Limeliters
2001 Recently Found- Glenn Yarbrough and The Limeliters Chicago Tapes I and II

Singles

See also
The Slightly Fabulous Limeliters
Our Men in San Francisco

References

External links



1930 births
2016 deaths
American folk singers
American male singers
American tenors
RCA Victor artists
Tradition Records artists
Musicians from Milwaukee
St. John's College (Annapolis/Santa Fe) alumni
Singers from Wisconsin
Military personnel from Milwaukee
The Limeliters members